STS 14 is a fossilized partial skeleton of the species Australopithecus africanus. It was discovered at Sterkfontein, South Africa by Robert Broom and John T. Robinson in August 1947, and is estimated to be about 2.5 million years old.

Some scientists have proposed that STS 14 may have come from the same individual as STS 5 though that fossil is considered only 2.15 million years old.

Description
The specimen consists of a pelvis, vertebral column and fragmentary rib and femur. Notable characteristics include the distinctly human-like shape of its pelvic blades, indicating a type of bipedalism. This find was the first to demonstrate, without a doubt, pre-Homo bipedality.

Curiously, the specimen has six lumbar vertebrae, more than either most humans, who have five, or modern apes, which may have five or fewer.

The specimen's sacrum contains an unfused intervertebral disk between the first and second sacral vertebrae, suggesting that the individual died before reaching maturity.

See also
 List of human fossils
 List of fossil sites (with link directory)
 List of hominina (hominid) fossils (with images)
 StW 505

References

External links
Image of STS 14

Maropeng - The Cradle of Humankind Official Website
UNESCO - Fossil Hominid Sites of Sterkfontein, Swartkrans, Kromdraai, and Environs

Australopithecus fossils
Quaternary fossil record
Archaeological discoveries in South Africa
1947 archaeological discoveries
Archaeology of Southern Africa